Peter John Thomas (born 18 October 1932) is a Welsh footballer who played in the Football League for Cardiff City, Exeter City and Newport County.

References

External links
 

Welsh footballers
English Football League players
1932 births
Living people
Cardiff City F.C. players
Exeter City F.C. players
Newport County A.F.C. players
Bath City F.C. players
Association football wingers